Puriscal is the 4th canton in the province of San José, Costa Rica.

The head city of the canton is Santiago.

Toponymy
A  is a field of flowering beans.

Geography 
Puriscal has an area of  km² and a mean elevation of  metres.

Chucás River delineates the canton's northernmost boundary, while the Chires River marks its far southern border, with the  canton of Parrita in Puntarenas Province.  Puriscal includes a major portion of the Coastal Mountain Range, however the canton is landlocked.

Demographics 

For the 2011 census, Puriscal had a population of  inhabitants.

Only 18% of the canton's population live in urban areas. Among its inhabitants, 20.2% are under 10 years old and 7.4% are over 65.

Districts 
The canton of Puriscal is subdivided into the following districts:
 Santiago
 Mercedes Sur
 Barbacoas
 Grifo Alto
 San Rafael
 Candelarita
 Desamparaditos
 San Antonio
 Chires

History
Purical canton was established by decree on 7 August 1868.

Transportation

Road transportation 
The canton is covered by the following road routes:

References
http://www.greenmangosa.com

Cantons of San José Province